Shane Bennett (born 5 December 1996) is an Irish hurler who plays as a centre-forward for the Waterford senior team.

Born in Ballysaggart, County Waterford, Bennett first played competitive hurling during his schooling at Blackwater Community School. He arrived on the inter-county scene at the age of fifteen when he first linked up with the Waterford minor team before later joining the under-21 side. Bennett played wing back in 2013 as Waterford won the All Ireland minor title for the first time since 1948. Three years later, he was part of the same team that captured the county's second All Ireland U-21 title, again beating Galway  He made his senior debut during the 2015 league. Bennett has since become a regular member of the starting fifteen.

At club level Bennett is a one-time Munster medallist in the junior grade with Ballysaggart. In addition to this he has also won one championship medal in the same grade.

His brothers, Kieran and Stephen, also plays with Waterford.

Honours

Player

Ballysaggart
Waterford Intermediate Hurling Championship (1): 2019
Munster Junior Club Hurling Championship (1): 2013
Waterford Junior Hurling Championship (1): 2013

Waterford
All-Ireland Minor Hurling Championship (1): 2013
Munster Under-21 Hurling Championship (1): 2016

References

1996 births
Living people
Ballysaggart hurlers
Waterford inter-county hurlers